Jim Nesbitt (December 1, 1931 – November 29, 2007) was an American country music singer. He had his first hit with "Please Mr. Kennedy" in 1961. It was released on Dot Records and became a number 11 hit on the Billboard charts. His biggest hit, "Lookin' for More in '64", got to number 7. He also recorded "A Tiger In My Tank". It stayed on the Cash Box charts for 13 weeks. He had several other hits on the Chart label. He released his last album, Phone Call From The Devil, in 1975 on Scorpion Records.

Discography

Albums

Singles

References

1931 births
2007 deaths
20th-century American singers
American country singer-songwriters
American novelty song performers
Dot Records artists
Smash Records artists
People from Bishopville, South Carolina
Country musicians from South Carolina
Singer-songwriters from South Carolina